Steven Cojocaru (born July 4, 1970), is a Canadian television  fashion critic. He was born in Montreal, Quebec to Romanian parents. Cojocaru started out as a magazine columnist and eventually began working on American television shows as a correspondent and interviewer on Entertainment Tonight, The Today Show, The Insider and Access Hollywood.

Steven earned a Bachelor's Degree in Communications from Concordia University.

Cojocaru began working in 1995 for the Canadian fashion magazine Flare. After moving to Hollywood, he began writing a column. He was People Magazine'''s West Coast fashion editor, and has written two autobiographies, Red Carpet Diaries: Confessions of a Glamour Boy (2003) and Glamour, Interrupted (2008).

In 2003 and 2004, Cojocaru worked on American Idol, helping the contestants select new wardrobe pieces from show sponsor Old Navy.

On May 6, 2008, he appeared with John Oliver in a segment for The Daily Show'', "Ticket to the Pollies".

Cojocaru has had two kidney transplants due to being afflicted by the genetic Polycystic Kidney Disease. The first (donated by his best friend) was removed when it became infected with polyomavirus. The second transplant in 2005, where his mother Amelia gave her kidney, has to date been successful.

Personal life
He is openly gay.

References

External links

Blog

1970 births
Living people
Anglophone Quebec people
Canadian LGBT journalists
Canadian gay writers
Canadian diarists
Canadian infotainers
Canadian television personalities
Canadian people of Romanian descent
Concordia University alumni
Canadian fashion journalists
Kidney transplant recipients
Television personalities from Montreal
Gay journalists